In the 10th edition of Systema Naturae, Carl Linnaeus classified the arthropods, including insects, arachnids and crustaceans, among his class "Insecta". Insects with hardened wing covers (beetles, earwigs and orthopteroid insects) were brought together under the name Coleoptera.

Scarabaeus (scarab beetles)

Scarabaeus hercules – male of Dynastes hercules 
Scarabaeus actaeon – Megasoma actaeon 
Scarabaeus simson – Strategus simson 
Scarabaeus atlas – Chalcosoma atlas 
Scarabaeus aloëus – Strategus aloeus 
Scarabaeus typhoeus – Typhaeus typhoeus 
Scarabaeus nasicornis – Oryctes nasicornis 
Scarabaeus lunaris – Copris lunaris 
Scarabaeus cylindricus – Sinodendron cylindricum 
Scarabaeus carnifex – Phanaeus carnifex
Scarabaeus rhinoceros – Oryctes rhinoceros 
Scarabaeus molossus – Catharsius molossus 
Scarabaeus mimas – Diabroctis mimas
Scarabaeus sacer – Scarabaeus sacer 
Scarabaeus didymus – Phileurus didymus 
Scarabaeus valgus – Phileurus valgus 
Scarabaeus nuchicornis – Onthophagus nuchicornis 
Scarabaeus subterraneus – Eupleurus subterraneus 
Scarabaeus erraticus – Colobopterus erraticus 
Scarabaeus maurus – Glaphyrus maurus 
Scarabaeus fossor – Teuchestes fossor 
Scarabaeus fimetarius – Aphodius fimetarius 
Scarabaeus haemorrhoidalis – Aphodius haemorrhoidalis 
Scarabaeus conspurcatus – Chilothorax conspurcatus
Scarabaeus gigas – Heliocopris gigas 
Scarabaeus scaber – female of Dynastes hercules 
Scarabaeus longimanus – Euchirus longimanus 
Scarabaeus pilularius – Canthon pilularius 
Scarabaeus schaefferi – Sisyphus schaefferi
Scarabaeus stercorarius – Geotrupes stercorarius 
Scarabaeus vernalis – Trypocopris vernalis 
Scarabaeus calcaratus
Scarabaeus fabulosus
Scarabaeus chrysis – Macraspis chrysis 
Scarabaeus nitidus – Cotinis nitida 
Scarabaeus lanigerus – Cotalpa lanigera 
Scarabaeus festivus – Oxysternon festivum
Scarabaeus lineola – Rutela lineola
Scarabaeus punctatus – Pelidnota punctata 
Scarabaeus sepicola
Scarabaeus syriacus – Pygopleurus syriacus 
Scarabaeus horticola – Phyllopertha horticola
Scarabaeus melolontha – Melolontha melolontha
Scarabaeus solstitialis – Amphimallon solstitialis
Scarabaeus hemipterus – Valgus hemipterus 
Scarabaeus fullo – Polyphylla fullo
Scarabaeus fasciatus – Trichius fasciatus 
Scarabaeus indus – Euphoria inda 
Scarabaeus brunnus – Serica brunnea
Scarabaeus capensis – Trichostetha capensis 
Scarabaeus lanius – Gymnetis lanius
Scarabaeus auratus – Cetonia aurata 
Scarabaeus variabilis – Gnorimus variabilis
Scarabaeus nobilis – Gnorimus nobilis
Scarabaeus rufipes – Acrossus rufipes 
Scarabaeus aquaticus – Hydrobius fuscipes
Scarabaeus ceratoniae – Sinoxylon ceratoniae 
Scarabaeus cervus – Lucanus cervus 
Scarabaeus interruptus – Passalus interruptus 
Scarabaeus carinatus – Chalcodes carinatus 
Scarabaeus tridentatus – artificial chimaera, comprising the head of Lucanus cervus on the body of Prionus coriarius 
Scarabaeus parallelipipedus – Dorcus parallelipipedus 
Scarabaeus caraboides – Platycerus caraboides

Dermestes (larder beetles)
Dermestes lardarius – Dermestes lardarius
Dermestes undatus – Megatoma undata
Dermestes pellio – Attagenus pellio, the carpet beetle
Dermestes pectinicornis – Ptilinus pectinicornis
Dermestes clavicornis – Orthocerus clavicornis
Dermestes pertinax – Hadrobregmus pertinax
Dermestes mollis – Ernobius mollis
Dermestes capucinus – Bostrichus capucinus
Dermestes typographus – Ips typographus
Dermestes micrographus – Pityophthorus micrographus
Dermestes poligraphus – Polygraphus poligraphus
Dermestes piniperda – Tomicus piniperda
Dermestes violaceus – Necrobia violacea
Dermestes fenestralis – Rhizophagus fenestralis
Dermestes domesticus – Trypodendron domesticum
Dermestes melanocephalus – Cercyon melanocephalus
Dermestes murinus – Dermestes murinus
Dermestes pilula – Byrrhus pilula
Dermestes scarabaeoides – Sphaeridium scarabaeoides
Dermestes scrophulariae – Anthrenus scrophulariae
Dermestes pisorum – Bruchus pisorum
Dermestes paniceus – Stegobium paniceum
Dermestes eustatius
Dermestes stercoreus – Typhaea stercorea
Dermestes pedicularius – Kateretes pedicularius
Dermestes pulicarius – Brachypterolus pulicarius
Dermestes psyllius
Dermestes scanicus – Cryptophagus scanicus
Dermestes colon
Dermestes surinamensis – Oryzaephilus surinamensis
Dermestes hemipterus – Carpophilus hemipterus

Hister (clown beetles)
Hister unicolor – Hister unicolor
Hister pygmaeus – Dendrophilus pygmaeus
Hister bimaculatus – Atholus bimaculatus
Hister quadrimaculatus – Hister quadrimaculatus

Silpha (carrion beetles)
Silpha germanica – Nicrophorus germanicus
Silpha vespillo – Nicrophorus vespillo
Silpha bipunctata – Nitidula bipunctata
Silpha quadripunctata – Glischrochilus quadripunctatus
Silpha indica
Silpha americana – Necrophila americana, the American carrion beetle
Silpha seminulum – Agathidium seminulum
Silpha agaricina – Scaphisoma agaricinum
Silpha maura
Silpha russica – Triplax russica
Silpha littoralis – Necrodes littoralis
Silpha atrata – Phosphuga atrata
Silpha thoracica – Oiceoptoma thoracicum
Silpha opaca – Aclypea opaca
Silpha rugosa – Thanatophilus rugosus
Silpha sabulosa – Opatrum sabulosum
Silpha obscura – Silpha obscura
Silpha ferruginea – Ostoma ferrugineum
Silpha grossa – Peltis grossa
Silpha oblonga – Grynocharis oblonga
Silpha aquatica – Helophorus aquaticus
Silpha colon – Omosita colon
Silpha depressa – Omosita depressa
Silpha grisea – Soronia grisea
Silpha aestiva – Epuraea aestiva
Silpha pedicularis

Cassida (tortoise beetles)
Cassida viridis – Cassida viridis
Cassida nebulosa – Cassida nebulosa
Cassida nobilis – Cassida nobilis
Cassida cruciata – Deloyala cruciata
Cassida bifasciata – Charidotella bifasciata
Cassida flava – Paraselenis flava
Cassida purpurea – Charidotella purpurea
Cassida marginata – Chelymorpha marginata
Cassida reticularis – Stolas reticularis
Cassida variegata – Discomorpha variegata
Cassida grossa – Eugenysa grossa
Cassida clatrata – Omaspides clathrata
Cassida jamaicensis – Eurypepla jamaicensis
Cassida cyanea – Cyrtonota cyanea
Cassida inaequalis – Stolas inaequalis
Cassida lateralis – Cyrtonota lateralis
Cassida discoides – Stolas discoides
Cassida petiveriana – Therea petiveriana

Coccinella (ladybirds or ladybugs)

Coccinella unipunctata – Cercyon unipunctatus
Coccinella 2-punctata – Adalia bipunctata
Coccinella 3-punctata – Coccinella undecimpunctata tripunctata
Coccinella hebraea – Anatis ocellata
Coccinella 5-punctata – Coccinella quinquepunctata
Coccinella trifasciata – Coccinella trifasciata
Coccinella hieroglyphica – Coccinella hieroglyphica
Coccinella 7-punctata – Coccinella septempunctata
Coccinella 9-punctata – Coccinella undecimpunctata
Coccinella 10-punctata – Adalia decempunctata
Coccinella 11-punctata – Coccinella undecimpunctata
Coccinella 13-punctata – Hippodamia tredecimpunctata
Coccinella 14-punctata – Propylea quatuordecimpunctata
Coccinella ocellata – Anatis ocellata
Coccinella 19-punctata – Anisosticta novemdecimpunctata
Coccinella 22-punctata – Psyllobora vigintiduopunctata
Coccinella 24-punctata – Subcoccinella vigintiquatuorpunctata
Coccinella 25-punctata – Subcoccinella vigintiquatuorpunctata
Coccinella conglobata – Oenopia conglobata
Coccinella conglomerata – Adalia conglomerata
Coccinella guttatopunctata – Adalia decempunctata
Coccinella 14-guttata – Calvia quatuordecimguttata
Coccinella 16-guttata – Halyzia sedecimguttata
Coccinella 18-guttata – Myrrha octodecimguttata
Coccinella 20-guttata – Sospita vigintiguttata
Coccinella oblongoguttata – Myzia oblongoguttata
Coccinella obliterata – Aphidecta obliterata
Coccinella 2-pustulata – Chilocorus bipustulatus
Coccinella 4-pustulata – Exochomus quadripustulatus
Coccinella 6-pustulata – Adalia bipunctata
Coccinella 10-pustulata – Adalia decempunctata
Coccinella 14-pustulata – Coccinula quatuordecimpustulata
Coccinella 16-pustulata
Coccinella gigantea
Coccinella pantherina – Adalia bipunctata
Coccinella tigrina – Sospita vigintiguttata

Chrysomela (leaf beetles)
Chrysomela göttingensis – Timarcha goettingensis
Chrysomela tanaceti – Galeruca tanaceti
Chrysomela haemorrhoidalis
Chrysomela graminis – Chrysolina graminis, the tansy beetle
Chrysomela aenea – Plagiosterna aenea
Chrysomela alni – Agelastica alni
Chrysomela betulae
Chrysomela haemoptera – Chrysolina haemoptera
Chrysomela occidentalis – Colaspis occidentalis
Chrysomela padi – Cyphon padi
Chrysomela armoraciae – Phaedon armoraciae
Chrysomela hypochaeridis – Cryptocephalus hypochaeridis
Chrysomela vulgatissima – Phratora vulgatissima, the blue willow beetle
Chrysomela vitellinae – Phratora vitellinae
Chrysomela polygoni – Gastrophysa polygoni
Chrysomela pallida – Gonioctena pallida
Chrysomela staphylaea – Chrysolina staphylaea
Chrysomela polita – Chrysolina polita
Chrysomela clavicornis – Aegithus clavicornis
Chrysomela populi – Chrysomela populi
Chrysomela viminalis – Gonioctena viminalis
Chrysomela 10-punctata
Chrysomela lapponica – Chrysomela lapponica
Chrysomela boleti – Diaperis boleti
Chrysomela collaris – Chrysomela collaris
Chrysomela sanguinolenta – Chrysolina sanguinolenta
Chrysomela marginata – Chrysolina marginata
Chrysomela marginella – Hydrothassa marginella
Chrysomela aestuans – Platyphora aestuans
Chrysomela coccinea – Endomychus coccineus
Chrysomela philadelphica – Calligrapha philadelphica
Chrysomela americana – Chrysolina americana
Chrysomela sacra – Entomoscelis sacra
Chrysomela minuta – Laccobius minutus
Chrysomela oleracea – Altica oleracea
Chrysomela chrysocephala – Psylliodes chrysocephala
Chrysomela hyoscyami – Psylliodes hyoscyami
Chrysomela erythrocephala – Chrysomela erythrocephala
Chrysomela helxines
Chrysomela exsoleta – Longitarsus exsoletus
Chrysomela nitidula – Crepidodera nitidula
Chrysomela nemorum – Phyllotreta nemorum
Chrysomela rufipes – Derocrepis rufipes
Chrysomela holsatica – Longitarsus holsaticus
Chrysomela hemisphaerica
Chrysomela surinamensis
Chrysomela litera
Chrysomela aequinoctialis – Omophoita aequinoctialis
Chrysomela tridentata – Labidostomis tridentata
Chrysomela 4-punctata – Clytra quadripunctata
Chrysomela 2-punctata – Cryptocephalus bipunctatus
Chrysomela moraei – Cryptocephalus moraei
Chrysomela nitida – Cryptocephalus nitidus
Chrysomela sericea – Cryptocephalus sericeus
Chrysomela coryli – Cryptocephalus coryli
Chrysomela pini – Cryptocephalus pini
Chrysomela bothnica – Cryptocephalus decemmaculatus
Chrysomela cordigera – Cryptocephalus cordiger
Chrysomela 6-punctata – Cryptocephalus sexpunctatus
Chrysomela 10-maculata – Cryptocephalus decemmaculatus
Chrysomela obscura – Bromius obscurus
Chrysomela merdigera – Lilioceris merdigera
Chrysomela nymphaeae – Galerucella nymphaeae
Chrysomela caprea – Lochmaea caprea
Chrysomela 4-maculata – Phyllobrotica quadrimaculata
Chrysomela cyanella – Lema cyanella
Chrysomela 12-punctata – Crioceris duodecimpunctata
Chrysomela melanopus – Oulema melanopus, the cereal leaf beetle
Chrysomela phellandrii – Prasocuris phellandrii
Chrysomela asparagi – Crioceris asparagi
Chrysomela cerasi – Orsodacne cerasi
Chrysomela sulphurea – Cteniopus sulphureus
Chrysomela cervina – Dascillus cervinus
Chrysomela ceramboides – Pseudocistela ceramboides
Chrysomela murina – Isomira murina
Chrysomela hirta – Lagria hirta
Chrysomela inda
Chrysomela elongata – Tillus elongatus

Curculio (true weevils)
Curculio palmarum – Rhynchophorus palmarum
Curculio indus
Curculio hemipterus – Metamasius hemipterus
Curculio violaceus – Magdalis violacea
Curculio alliariae
Curculio cyaneus – Orobitis cyanea
Curculio aterrimus
Curculio cerasi – Magdalis cerasi
Curculio acridulus – Notaris acridulus
Curculio purpureus
Curculio frumentarius – Apion frumentarium
Curculio granarius – Sitophilus granarius
Curculio dorsalis – Dorytomus dorsalis
Curculio melanocardius – Rhodobaenus melanocardius
Curculio pini – Pissodes pini
Curculio rumicis – Hypera rumicis
Curculio lapathi – Cryptorhynchus lapathi
Curculio cupreus – Involvulus cupreus
Curculio scaber – Otiorhynchus scaber
Curculio T-album – Limnobaris t-album
Curculio quercus – Orchestes quercus
Curculio arator – Hypera arator
Curculio 2-punctatus – Ellescus bipunctatus
Curculio 4-maculatus – Nedyus quadrimaculatus
Curculio 5-maculatus
Curculio pericarpius – Rhinoncus pericarpius
Curculio scrophulariae – Cionus scrophulariae
Curculio vittatus – Exophthalmus vittatus
Curculio paraplecticus – Lixus paraplecticus
Curculio algirus – Lixomorphus algirus
Curculio bacchus – Rhynchites bacchus
Curculio betulae – Byctiscus betulae
Curculio populi – Byctiscus populi
Curculio alni – Orchestes alni
Curculio salicis – Tachyerges salicis
Curculio fagi – Orchestes fagi
Curculio segetis – Orchestes pilosus
Curculio pomorum – Anthonomus pomorum
Curculio ovatus – Otiorhynchus ovatus
Curculio carbonarius – Magdalis carbonaria
Curculio mucoreus
Curculio pusio
Curculio vaginalis – Cratosomus vaginalis
Curculio stigma – Rhinochenus stigma
Curculio depressus – Homalinotus depressus
Curculio annulatus – Cholus annulatus
Curculio dispar – Estenorhinus dispar
Curculio anchorago – Brentus anchorago
Curculio abietis – Hylobius abietis, the pine weevil
Curculio germanus – Liparus germanus
Curculio nucum – Curculio nucum
Curculio 5-punctatus – Tychius quinquepunctatus
Curculio hispidus – Trachodes hispidus
Curculio rectirostris – Anthonomus rectirostris
Curculio pedicularius – Anthonomus pedicularius
Curculio ligustici – Otiorhynchus ligustici
Curculio pyri – Phyllobius pyri
Curculio oblongus – Phyllobius oblongus
Curculio argentatus – Phyllobius argentatus
Curculio ovatus – Otiorhynchus ovatus
Curculio cervinus – Polydrusus cervinus
Curculio argyreus – Compsus argyreus
Curculio viridis – Chlorophanus viridis
Curculio speciosus – Rhigus speciosus
Curculio ruficornis – Magdalis ruficornis
Curculio albinus – Platystomos albinus
Curculio lineatus – Sitona lineatus
Curculio incanus – Brachyderes incanus
Curculio cloropus – Phyllobius viridicollis
Curculio rufipes
Curculio nebulosus – Coniocleonus nebulosus
Curculio ater – Rhyncolus ater
Curculio emeritus
Curculio barbarus – Brachycerus barbarus
Curculio cornutus
Curculio 16-punctatus – Ericydeus sedecimpunctatus
Curculio granulatus – Entimus granulatus
Curculio abbreviatus – Diaprepes abbreviatus
Curculio chinensis – Callosobruchus chinensis
Curculio apterus – Brachycerus apterus

Attelabus (leaf-rolling weevils)
Attelabus coryli – Apoderus coryli
Attelabus surinamensis
Attelabus pensylvanicus
Attelabus betulae – Deporaus betulae
Attelabus formicarius – Thanasimus formicarius
Attelabus sipylus – Trichodes sipylus
Attelabus apiarius – Trichodes apiarius
Attelabus mollis – Opilo mollis
Attelabus ceramboides – Upis ceramboides
Attelabus buprestoides – Spondylis buprestoides

Cerambyx (longhorn beetles)

Cerambyx longimanus – Acrocinus longimanus 
Cerambyx trochlearis – Macropophora trochlearis 
Cerambyx cervicornis – Macrodontia cervicornis 
Cerambyx coriarius – Prionus coriarius 
Cerambyx cinnamomeus – Callipogon cinnamomeus 
Cerambyx festivus – Chlorida festivus 
Cerambyx lineatus – Elateropsis lineatus 
Cerambyx spinibarbis – Mallodon spinibarbis 
Cerambyx batus – Juiaparus batus 
Cerambyx rubus – Batocera rubus 
Cerambyx ferrugineus
Cerambyx sentis – Batocera sentis 
Cerambyx farinosus – Taeniotes farinosus 
Cerambyx depressus – Macropophora trochlearis 
Cerambyx glaucus – Oreodera glauca 
Cerambyx lamed – Pachyta lamed 
Cerambyx nebulosus – Leiopus nebulosus 
Cerambyx hispidus – Pogonocherus hispidus 
Cerambyx desertus – Epepeotes desertus
Cerambyx succinctus – Trachyderes succinctus 
Cerambyx virens
Cerambyx moschatus – Aromia moschata
Cerambyx alpinus – Rosalia alpina 
Cerambyx aedilis – Acanthocinus aedilis 
Cerambyx sutor – Monochamus sutor 
Cerambyx cerdo – Cerambyx cerdo 
Cerambyx textor – Lamia textor 
Cerambyx fuliginator – Iberodorcadion fuliginator 
Cerambyx coquus – Tragiodon coquus
Cerambyx cursor – Oxymirus cursor 
Cerambyx kaehleri – Purpuricenus kaehleri 
Cerambyx inquisitor – Rhagium inquisitor 
Cerambyx fur – Ptinus fur 
Cerambyx carcharias – Saperda carcharias 
Cerambyx scalaris – Saperda scalaris 
Cerambyx populneus – Saperda populnea 
Cerambyx cylindricus – Phytoecia cylindrica 
Cerambyx oculatus – Oberea oculata 
Cerambyx zonarius – Gnoma zonaria 
Cerambyx serraticornis – Calopus serraticornis 
Cerambyx rusticus – Arhopalus rusticus
Cerambyx femoratus – Ropalopus femoratus
Cerambyx violaceus – Callidium violaceum 
Cerambyx auratus – Hileolaspis auratus
Cerambyx stigma – Neomegaderus stigma
Cerambyx striatus – Asemum striatum 
Cerambyx testaceus – Phymatodes testaceus 
Cerambyx bajulus – Hylotrupes bajulus 
Cerambyx fennicus – Phymatodes testaceus
Cerambyx undatus – Semanotus undatus 
Cerambyx sanguineus – Pyrrhidium sanguineum 
Cerambyx castaneus – Tetropium castaenum

Leptura
Leptura aquatica – Donacia aquatica
Leptura melanura – Stenurella melanura
Leptura rubra – Stictoleptura rubra
Leptura virens – Lepturobosca virens
Leptura sericea – Plateumaris sericea
Leptura 4-maculata – Pachyta quadrimaculata
Leptura meridiana – Stenocorus meridianus
Leptura interrogationis – Brachyta interrogationis
Leptura 6-maculata – Judolia sexmaculata
Leptura 4-fasciata – Leptura quadrifasciata
Leptura attenuata – Strangalia attenuata
Leptura nigra – Stenurella nigra
Leptura virginea – Gaurotes virginea
Leptura collaris – Dinoptera collaris
Leptura rustica – Xylotrechus rusticus
Leptura mystica – Anaglyptus mysticus
Leptura necydalea – Isthmiade necydalea
Leptura detrita – Plagionotus detritus
Leptura arcuata – Plagionotus arcuatus
Leptura arietis – Clytus arietis
Leptura praeusta – Tetrops praeusta
Leptura linearis

Cantharis (soldier beetles)
Cantharis noctiluca – Lampyris noctiluca, the common glow-worm
Cantharis pyralis – Photinus pyralis
Cantharis lampyris
Cantharis ignita – Aspisoma ignitum
Cantharis lucida
Cantharis phosphorea
Cantharis mauritanica – Pelania mauritanica
Cantharis chinensis
Cantharis italica – Luciola italica
Cantharis fusca – Cantharis fusca
Cantharis livida – Cantharis livida
Cantharis rufa – Cantharis rufa
Cantharis sanguinea – Lygistopterus sanguineus
Cantharis obscura – Cantharis obscura
Cantharis lateralis – Cantharis lateralis
Cantharis aenea – Malachius aeneus
Cantharis bipustulata – Malachius bipustulatus
Cantharis pedicularia – Ebaeus pedicularius
Cantharis fasciata – Anthocomus fasciatus
Cantharis biguttata – Malthinus biguttatus
Cantharis minima – Malthodes minimus
Cantharis testacea – Rhagonycha testacea
Cantharis pectinata
Cantharis serrata
Cantharis tropica
Cantharis pectinicornis – Schizotus pectinicornis
Cantharis caerulea – Ischnomera caerulea
Cantharis viridissima – Chrysanthia viridissima
Cantharis navalis – Lymexylon navale
Cantharis melanura – Nacerdes melanura

Elater (click beetles)
Elater oculatus – Alaus oculatus
Elater noctilucus – Pyrophorus noctilucus
Elater phosphoreus – Ignelater phosphoreus
Elater brunneus – Sericus brunneus
Elater syriacus – Cardiophorus syriacus
Elater cruciatus – Selatosomus cruciatus
Elater linearis – Denticollis linearis
Elater ruficollis – Cardiophorus ruficollis
Elater mesomelus – Denticollis linearis
Elater castaneus – Anostirus castaneus
Elater ferrugineus – Elater ferrugineus
Elater sanguineus – Ampedus sanguineus
Elater balteatus – Ampedus balteatus
Elater marginatus – Dalopius marginatus
Elater sputator – Agriotes sputator
Elater obscurus – Agriotes obscurus
Elater tristis – Ampedus tristis
Elater fasciatus – Danosoma fasciatum
Elater murinus – Agrypnus murinus
Elater tessellatus – Prosternon tessellatum
Elater aeneus – Selatosomus aeneus
Elater pectinicornis – Ctenicera pectinicornis
Elater niger – Hemicrepidius niger
Elater minutus – Limonius minutus

Cicindela (ground beetles)
Cicindela campestris – Cicindela campestris, the green tiger beetle
Cicindela hybrida – Cicindela hybrida, the northern dune tiger beetle
Cicindela germanica – Cylindera germanica
Cicindela sylvatica – Cicindela sylvatica, the wood tiger beetle
Cicindela maura – Cassolaia maura
Cicindela riparia – Elaphrus riparius
Cicindela aquatica – Notiophilus aquaticus

Buprestis (jewel beetles)
Buprestis gigantea – Euchroma gigantea
Buprestis 8-guttata – Buprestis octoguttata
Buprestis gnita – Chrysochroa ignita
Buprestis stricta – Pelecopselaphus strictus
Buprestis sternicornis – Sternocera sternicornis
Buprestis mariana – Chalcophora mariana
Buprestis chrysostigma – Chrysobothris chrysostigma
Buprestis rustica – Buprestis rustica
Buprestis fascicularis – Julodis fascicularis
Buprestis hirta – Neojulodis hirta
Buprestis nitidula – Anthaxia nitidula
Buprestis bimaculata – Strigoptera bimaculata
Buprestis tristis – Lampetis tristis
Buprestis cuprea – Oedisterna cuprea
Buprestis nobilis – Actenodes nobilis
Buprestis 4-punctata – Anthaxia quadripunctata
Buprestis minuta – Trachys minutus
Buprestis viridis – Agrilus viridis
Buprestis linearis – Dismorpha linearis

Dytiscus (Dytiscidae)
Dytiscus piceus – Hydrophilus piceus
Dytiscus caraboides – Hydrochara caraboides
Dytiscus fuscipes – Hydrobius fuscipes
Dytiscus latissimus – Dytiscus latissimus
Dytiscus marginalis – Great diving beetle
Dytiscus striatus – Colymbetes striatus
Dytiscus fuscus – Colymbetes fuscus
Dytiscus cinereus – Graphoderus cinereus
Dytiscus semistriatus – Dytiscus marginalis
Dytiscus sulcatus – Acilius sulcatus
Dytiscus erytrocephalus – Hydroporus erythrocephalus
Dytiscus maculatus – Platambus maculatus
Dytiscus minutus – Laccophilus minutus
Dytiscus natator – Gyrinus natator
Dytiscus scarabaeoides – Hydrobius fuscipes

Carabus
Carabus coriaceus – Carabus coriaceus
Carabus granulatus – Carabus granulatus
Carabus leucophthalmus – Sphodrus leucophthalmus
Carabus nitens – Carabus nitens
Carabus hortensis – Carabus hortensis
Carabus violaceus – Carabus violaceus
Carabus cephalotes – Broscus cephalotes
Carabus inquisitor – Calosoma inquisitor
Carabus sycophanta – Calosoma sycophanta
Carabus lividus – Nebria livida
Carabus crepitans – Brachinus crepitans
Carabus americanus – Galerita americana
Carabus spinipes – Amara aulica
Carabus cyanocephalus – Lebia cyanocephala
Carabus melanocephalus – Calathus melanocephalus
Carabus vaporariorum – Cymindis vaporariorum
Carabus latus – Harpalus latus
Carabus ferrugineus – Leistus ferrugineus
Carabus germanus – Diachromus germanus
Carabus vulgaris – Pterostichus melanarius
Carabus caerulescens – Poecilus cupreus
Carabus cupreus – Poecilus cupreus
Carabus piceus – Agonum piceum
Carabus marginatus – Agonum marginatum
Carabus multipunctatus – Blethisa multipunctata
Carabus 6-punctatus – Agonum sexpunctatum
Carabus ustulatus
Carabus crux major – Panagaeus cruxmajor
Carabus crux minor – Lebia cruxminor
Carabus 4-maculatus – Dromius quadrimaculatus
Carabus atricapillus – Demetrias atricapillus

Tenebrio (darkling beetles)
Tenebrio molitor – Mealworm
Tenebrio mauritanicus – Tenebroides mauritanicus, the Cadelle Beetle
Tenebrio culinaris – Uloma culinaris
Tenebrio barbarus
Tenebrio fossor – Clivina fossor
Tenebrio cursor – Oryzaephilus surinamensis
Tenebrio pedicularius
Tenebrio erraticus
Tenebrio pallens – Antherophagus pallens
Tenebrio mortisagus – Blaps mortisaga
Tenebrio muricatus – Adesmia muricata
Tenebrio caeruleus – Helops caeruleus
Tenebrio angulatus
Tenebrio caraboides – Cychrus caraboides

Meloe (blister beetles)
Meloe proscarabaeus – Meloe proscarabaeus
Meloe majalis
Meloe vesicatorius – Lytta vesicatoria, Spanish fly
Meloe syriacus
Meloe cichorii
Meloe algiricus
Meloe schaefferi – Cerocoma schaefferi
Meloe floralis

Mordella (tumbling flower beetles)
Mordella aculeata – Mordella aculeata
Mordella humeralis – Mordellistena humeralis
Mordella frontalis – Anaspis frontalis
Mordella thoracica – Anaspis thoracica
Mordella flava – Anaspis flava

Necydalis (necydaline beetles)
Necydalis major – Necydalis major 
Necydalis minor – Molorchus minor

Staphylinus (rove beetles)
Staphylinus hirtus – Emus hirtus
Staphylinus murinus – Ontholestes murinus
Staphylinus maxillosus – Creophilus maxillosus
Staphylinus erytropterus – Staphylinus erythropterus
Staphylinus politus – Philonthus polius
Staphylinus rufus  Oxyporus rufus
Staphylinus riparius – Paederus riparius
Staphylinus lignorum – Tachinus lignorum
Staphylinus subterraneus – Tachinus subterraneus
Staphylinus flavescens – Quedius cinctus
Staphylinus 2-guttatus – Stenus biguttatus
Staphylinus littoreus – Sepedophilus pubescens
Staphylinus sanguineus – Aleochara sanguinea
Staphylinus caraboides – Anthophagus caraboides
Staphylinus chrysomelinus – Tachyporus chrysomelinus
Staphylinus flavipes – Phloestiba plana
Staphylinus fuscipes – Gyrohypnus fuscipes
Staphylinus rufipes – Tachinus rufipes
Staphylinus boleti – Gyrophaena boleti

Forficula (earwigs)
Forficula auricularia – Forficula auricularia 
Forficula minor – Labia minor

Blatta (cockroaches)

Blatta gigantea – Blaberus giganteus
Blatta aegyptiaca – Polyphaga aegyptiaca
Blatta surinamensis – Pycnoscelus surinamensis, Surinam cockroach
Blatta americana – Periplaneta americana, American cockroach
Blatta nivea – Panchlora nivea
Blatta africana – Hemelytroblatta africana
Blatta orientalis – Blatta orientalis, Oriental cockroach
Blatta lapponica – Ectobius lapponicus
Blatta oblongata – Pseudomops oblongata

Gryllus (other orthopteroid insects)

Mantis
Gryllus gigas – Phasma gigas
Gryllus phthisicus – Pseudophasma phthisicum
Gryllus siccifolius – Phyllium siccifolium
Gryllus gongylodes – Gongylus gongylodes
Gryllus religiosus – Mantis religiosa, European mantis
Gryllus oratorius – Iris oratoria
Gryllus precarius – Stagmatoptera precaria
Gryllus bicornis – Schizocephala bicornis
Gryllus tricolor – Harpagomantis tricolor
Gryllus strumarius – Choeradodis strumaria

Acrida
Gryllus nasutus – Truxalis nasuta
Gryllus turritus – Acrida turrita

Bulla
Gryllus unicolor – Bullacris unicolor
Gryllus variolosus – Physemacris variolosa
Gryllus serratus – Prionolopha serrata
Gryllus carinatus – Porthetis carinata
Gryllus bipunctatus – Tetrix bipunctata
Gryllus subulatus – Tetrix subulata

Acheta

Gryllus gryllotalpa – Gryllotalpa gryllotalpa
Gryllus domesticus – Gryllus domesticus, house cricket
Gryllus campestris – Gryllus campestris
Gryllus umbraculatus – Sciobia umbraculata

Tettigonia
Gryllus citrifolius – Cnemidophyllum citrifolium
Gryllus laurifolius – Stilpnochlora laurifolia
Gryllus myrtifolius – Viadana myrtifolia
Gryllus elongatus – Mecopoda elongata
Gryllus lamellatus – Anoedopoda lamellata
Gryllus ocellatus – Pterochroza ocellata
Gryllus acuminatus – Oxyprora acuminata
Gryllus triops – Neoconocephalus triops
Gryllus rugosus – Sathrophyllia rugosa
Gryllus coronatus – Championica coronata
Gryllus aquilinus – Acanthodis aquilina
Gryllus melanopterus – Clonia melanoptera
Gryllus fastigiatus – Gryllacris fastigiata
Gryllus coriaceus – Sexava coriacea
Gryllus viridissimus – Tettigonia viridissima
Gryllus verrucivorus – Decticus verrucivorus, wart-biter
Gryllus pupus – Hetrodes pupus

Locusta

Gryllus elephas – Pamphagus elephas
Gryllus cristatus – Tropidacris cristata
Gryllus morbillosus – Phymateus morbillosus
Gryllus miliaris – Aularches miliaris
Gryllus haematopus – Euryphymus haematopus
Gryllus migratorius – Migratory locust
Gryllus tataricus – Cyrtacanthacaris tatarica
Gryllus variegatus – Zonocerus variegatus
Gryllus caerulescens – Oedipoda caerulescens
Gryllus italicus – Calliptamus italicus
Gryllus stridulus – Psophus stridulus
Gryllus carolinus – Dissosteira carolina
Gryllus obscurus – Pycnodictya obscura
Gryllus flavus – Oedaleus flavus
Gryllus apricarius – Chorthippus apricarius
Gryllus viridulus – Omocestus viridulus
Gryllus biguttulus – Chorthippus biguttulus
Gryllus rufus – Gomphocerippus rufus
Gryllus grossus – Stethophyma grossum
Gryllus pedestris – Podisma pedestris

Footnotes

References

Systema Naturae
 Systema Naturae, Coleoptera